MIJARC Europe (Mouvement International de la Jeunesse Agricole et Rurale Catholique, or International Movement of Catholic Agricultural and Rural Youth) is the European continental branch of MIJARC. It is the platform or umbrella organization, representing the catholic, agricultural and rural youth movements in Europe. It has member movements and contact movements in Portugal (JARC), Spain (MJRC and JARC Catalonia), France (MRJC), Belgium (KLJ), Germany (KLJB), Hungary (KIM), Austria (KJÖ), Poland (EiR), Bulgaria (YMDRAB), Armenia (FYCA), Georgia (Umbrella), Italy (Futuro Digitale), Malta (Innovative Youth), the Netherlands (Stichting Euromove), Slovakia (ADEL) and Romania (APSD-Agenda 21), representing around 150 000 rural young people aged from 12 to 35 years old. At world level, MIJARC represents more than two million young people from Asia, Africa, Latin America and Europe.

Officially registered in 1996 as non-profit organization, based in Belgium, MIJARC Europe strives to implement and raise awareness about sustainable agricultural, rural and international development, European citizenship, youth policies, gender equality, environmental protection, interculturality and human rights, by facilitating inter-cultural exchanges, camps, seminars, campaigns and non-formal learning opportunities in a sustainable and culturally sensitive manner, considering the Christian values. MIJARC Europe is driven by Christian values, advocating tolerance, respect, solidarity and peace. MIJARC Europe supports the empowerment and personal development of young people through educational activities, with the aim of creating opportunities for the development of thriving rural communities. Its various activities (summer camps, seminars, training courses, study-sessions and non-formal learning opportunities) empower young people to participate actively in society to advocate for the interests of their organisations and communities on a local and European level. 

MIJARC Europe is a member of the European Youth Forum (YFJ) and the European Coordination La Via Campesina (ECVC) and has a participatory status in the Council of Europe, with a representative in the Advisory Council on Youth.

Structure

MIJARC Europe member movements have a "bottom-up" structure, starting at the grassroots level. Rural young people gather in local groups. Their leaders gather in regional (diocesan) boards, and some regional representatives gather at the national level (national board).

MIJARC Europe itself is run by the Executive Board or European Team, composed of three to five elected representatives that can be proposed by member movements.

The European Team is observed by the European Coordination, which is composed by one elected representative from each member movement, called European coordinator.

At the top of decision-making is the General Assembly which is represented by each member movement. Every four years is led an "Orientations General Assembly" which prepares and decides the action plan of MIJARC Europe for the next four years. The next one is scheduled for 2021.

Working topics

MIJARC Europe's Action Plan for 2017-2021 includes specific objectives on the topics of:
 Human rights
 A European vision towards an interconnected world
 Environmental protection
 Youth participation
 Food sovereignty and sustainable agriculture in Europe
 Holistic quality of education and lifelong learning in rural areas (with special emphasis in the recognition of non-formal and informal  education)
 Solidarity based economy

Current Board

The board consists of five members and is elected for a mandate of three years at the General Assembly. The board members act on the same hierarchical level.

Former Board members

References

External links
 

Catholic youth organizations
Organizations with participatory status with the Council of Europe
Youth organisations based in Belgium